The naval Battle of Texel or Battle of Kijkduin took place off the southern coast of island of Texel on 21 August 1673 (11 August O.S.) between the Dutch and the combined English and French fleets. It was the last major battle of the Third Anglo-Dutch War, which was itself part of the Franco-Dutch War (1672–1678), during which Louis XIV of France invaded the Republic and sought to establish control over the Spanish Netherlands. English involvement came about because of the Treaty of Dover, secretly concluded by Charles II of England, and which was highly unpopular with the English Parliament.

The overall commanders of the English and Dutch military forces were Lord High Admiral James, Duke of York, later James II, and Admiral-General William III of Orange, his son-in-law and another future King of England. Neither of them took part in the fight.

Prince Rupert of the Rhine commanded the Allied fleet of about 92 ships and 30 fireships, taking control of the centre himself, with Jean II d'Estrées commanding the van, and Sir Edward Spragge the rear division. The Dutch fleet of 75 ships and 30 fireships was commanded by Lieutenant-Admiral-General Michiel de Ruyter, with Lieutenant-Admirals Adriaen Banckert in charge of the van and Cornelis Tromp the rear. Although the Dutch ships were smaller on average than their opponents, their crews were better trained and more experienced.

Battle

In late July, Rupert put to sea again, hoping to draw the Dutch fleet north by feinting against The Hague or Den Helder. De Ruyter initially remained at Schooneveld, but William ordered him to escort an inbound Dutch East India Company treasure fleet, whose capture could provide Charles enough funds to continue the war.

De Ruyter first decided not to leave his defensive position in the Schooneveld, from which he had successfully engaged the allied fleet in the double Battle of Schooneveld. However the Dutch Spice Fleet was returning from the Indies, filled with precious cargo. With half the country under French occupation for almost a year, the Dutch Republic's finances were in disastrous straits. The Dutch could not afford to lose the wealth the Spice Fleet was bringing, let alone allow it to be captured by the enemy. As such stadtholder William ordered De Ruyter to seek to engage the enemy.

Although outnumbered, De Ruyter gained the weather gauge and sent his van under Adriaen Banckert in to separate the Allied van (under D'Estrées) from the main fleet. His ploy was effective, and the French ships were unable to play a significant part in the remainder of the battle, which became a gruelling encounter between the bulk of the Dutch fleet and the English centre and rear divisions. Both suffered badly during hours of fierce fighting.

Once again, the rear divisions led by Spragge and Tromp clashed repeatedly, Spragge having publicly sworn to kill or capture his old enemy. Each had to shift their flags to fresh ships three times; on the third occasion, Spragge drowned when the boat transporting him sank. More importantly, his preoccupation with duelling Tromp isolated the English centre, and was a key factor in allowing an inferior but better managed fleet to succeed.

The fight between the English and Dutch centre under De Ruyter and Lieutenant-Admiral Aert Jansse van Nes continued for hours, with each side gaining the weather gauge as the winds shifted. Having disengaged from the French, Banckert joined the Dutch centre, followed first by Rupert, then De Ruyter; the main focus of the fight was a Dutch attempt to capture Spragge's isolated flagship, the Prince. This was unsuccessful, and with both fleets exhausted, the Allies withdrew; although no major ships sunk, many were seriously damaged and about 3,000 men died, two-thirds of them English or French.

Aftermath

After the battle, Prince Rupert complained the French had not done their share of the fighting, and their performance is still disputed. While Prud'homme states the French fought hard, he accepts they allowed themselves to become separated from the English fleet. The main dispute is whether this was deliberate; D'Estrées had been ordered by Louis XIV to preserve the French fleet, and thus disobeyed Rupert's orders to attack the Dutch, claiming the wind was too weak. By the admission of several French officers, their fleet was not prominent in the action, but they attributed this to inexperience.

The size of the Allied fleet and length of its battle line, combined with inadequacies in fighting instructions and signalling, made it hard to control. It deepened suspicions between the English and French, further undercutting popular support for the war, while ending any hopes of starving the Dutch through a naval blockade, making it an overwhelming strategic victory for the Dutch. This campaign was the highlight of De Ruyter's career, as acknowledged by the Duke of York, who concluded "he was the greatest that ever to that time was in the world".

Despite losing four ships, the Spice Fleet arrived safely, bringing the much needed financial reprieve. In the months following, the Netherlands formed a formal alliance with Spain and the Holy Roman Empire. The threat posed by German and Spanish invasions from the south and east forced the French to withdraw from the territory of the Republic. The Third Anglo-Dutch War came to an end with the signing of the Treaty of Westminster between the English and the Dutch in 1674. Fourteen years later the Glorious Revolution, which saw Stadtholder William III ascend the throne of England, put an end to the Anglo-Dutch conflicts of the 17th century. Only in 1781 would the Dutch and British fleets fight each other again in the battle of Dogger Bank.

Gallery

Ships involved

England and France
?
[cf "Journals and Narratives of the Third Dutch War", Roger Charles Anderson, Naval Records Society, London. Complete English ship lists are given for the naval battles of this war, but smaller vessels, e.g. fireships, of which there were many present during this action, are not included in Anderson's book.] John Winkler

White Squadron (French): 30 SOLs about 1828 guns
27 SOLs from the previous battle, plus 3 new ones:
Royale Therese 80 - RA Marquis de Martel
Pompeux 70
Diamant 60

The Netherlands

Admiralty of Amsterdam

Admiralty of de Maze

Admiralty of the Northern Quarter

Admiralty of Zealand

Admiralty of Frisia

References

Sources
 
 
 
 

Conflicts in 1673
1673 in the Dutch Republic
Military history of the North Sea
Naval battles of the Third Anglo-Dutch War
Battles in North Holland
Battle
Naval battles involving the Dutch Republic
Naval battles involving England
Naval battles involving France
Naval battles of the Franco-Dutch War